Florian Kapała (1929 - 2007) was an international speedway rider from Poland.

Speedway career 
Kapała reached the final of the Speedway World Championship in the 1961 Individual Speedway World Championship.

He was a four times Polish champion after he won gold at the Polish Individual Speedway Championship in 1953, 1956, 1961 and 1962.

Kapała won the World Team Cup with Poland in 1961.

World final appearances

Individual World Championship
 1959 -  London, Wembley Stadium - Reserve - Did not ride
 1961 –  Malmö, Malmö Stadion - 7th - 8pts

World Team Cup
 1961 -  Wrocław, Olympic Stadium (with Marian Kaiser / Henryk Żyto / Mieczysław Połukard / Stanisław Tkocz) - Winner - 32pts (6)
 1962 -  Slaný (with Marian Kaiser / Mieczysław Połukard / Joachim Maj / Paweł Waloszek) - 3rd - 20pts (5)

References 

1929 births
2007 deaths
Polish speedway riders